The Chinese blue flycatcher (Cyornis glaucicomans) is a small passerine bird in the flycatcher family, Muscicapidae. The Chinese blue flycatcher is found in southern China and the Malay Peninsula. It previously was considered a subspecies of the blue-throated blue flycatcher.

References

Zhang, Z., X. Wang, Y. Huang, U. Olsson, J. Martinez, P. Alström, and F. Lei. 2015. Unexpected divergence and lack of divergence revealed in continental Asian Cyornis flycatchers (Aves: Muscicapidae). Molecular Phylogenetics and Evolution 94: 232–241.

Chinese blue flycatcher
Birds of China
Birds of Thailand
Birds of Southeast Asia
Chinese blue flycatcher
Chinese blue flycatcher
Chinese blue flycatcher